Donald Currie Sillars (30 October 1868 – 25 September 1905)  was a Scottish footballer, who played as a half-back or (in emergencies) right back for Battlefield, Pollokshields Athletic, Queen's Park, Rangers and Scotland.  Sillars was also a captain in the Glasgow Highlanders.

Sillars died after being found injured on the Paisley and Barrhead Railway Line.

See also
List of Scotland national football team captains

References

Sources

External links
London Hearts profile

1868 births
1905 deaths
Scottish footballers
Scotland international footballers
Queen's Park F.C. players
Rangers F.C. players
Association football fullbacks
People from Govan
Footballers from Glasgow
Pollokshields Athletic F.C. players
Battlefield F.C. players